Innsbruck Hötting railway station is a railway station in the borough of Hötting in Innsbruck, the capital city of the Austrian state of Tyrol.
It is the first station on the Mittenwald Railway (Karwendelbahn) north of Innsbruck West station (de), where the line branches off the Arlberg railway. The station was opened in 1912 and is served by trains operated by both Deutsche Bahn and Austrian Federal Railways (ÖBB).

The station is 1.8 kilometres from Innsbruck West station. The travel time to Innsbruck Main station is 7 minutes, the travel time to Seefeld is 30 minutes.

Description 
The station lies in Hötting, to the west of the town centre, between Fürstenweg, to which it is connected by a pedestrian path, and Ampfererstraße from which there is car access. Is it geographically the closest rail station to the Innsbruck Airport, from where local bus F travels along Fürstenweg near the station.

The station has two tracks on the both sides of an island passenger platform.

There are plans to move the station to the north, closer to Höttinger Au, where a transfer to the tram network will be possible.

Rail services

As of January 2019, the typical off-peak services from the station are:

2 tph (trains per hour) to Innsbruck Main station via Innsbruck West station. This includes Tyrol S-Bahn trains from Seefeld as well as REX trains from Munich or Garmisch-Partenkirchen
2 tph to Seefeld, half of which continue to Garmisch-Partenkirchen or further to Munich.

References

External links
 

Railway stations in Tyrol (state)
Railway stations opened in 1912